The Billboard Regional Mexican Songs chart ranks the best-performing Regional Mexican singles in the United States. Published weekly by Billboard magazine, it ranks the "most popular regional Mexican songs, ranked by radio airplay audience impressions as measured by Nielsen Music."

1994

1995

References

United States Regional Mexican Songs
United States Regional Mexican Songs
Regional Mexican 1994
1994 in Latin music
1995 in Latin music